Die Woche ("The Week") was an illustrated weekly newspaper published in Berlin from 1899 to 1944. It reported on popular entertainment, including "sensationalist crime stories", and covered celebrities in sports and show business. Its publisher was newspaper magnate August Scherl, who also owned the Berliner Lokal-Anzeiger, a Berlin paper.

By 1916 Scherl had been bought out by the (politically conservative) Hugenberg Press, and Die Woche came to play a part in the politics of the day, specifically in promoting an image of Paul von Hindenburg as both a military man and a civilian, aiding his appeal across the German population.

A Turkish weekly magazine, Yedigün, inspired from Die Woche.

References

 Ralf Dahrendorf: Liberal und unabhängig. Gerd Bucerius und seine Zeit. 2nd edition. Beck, München 2000,

External links

 Advertisement for Die Woche  Zentral- und Landesbibliothek Berlin 1900

1899 establishments in Germany
1944 disestablishments in Germany
Defunct newspapers published in Germany
Defunct weekly newspapers
German-language newspapers
Newspapers published in Berlin
Newspapers established in 1899
Publications disestablished in 1944
Weekly newspapers published in Germany